Las Heras usually refers to General Juan Gregorio de las Heras, a military leader in the South American Wars of Independence. There are several places in Argentina named after him:
 Las Heras, Mendoza, a town
 Las Heras Department, whose chief town is Las Heras, Mendoza
 General Las Heras, Buenos Aires, a town 
 General Las Heras Partido, whose chief town is General Las Heras
 Las Heras (Buenos Aires Underground), a railway station
 Las Heras, Santa Cruz